Peter Swart (July 5, 1752 – November 3, 1829) was a United States Representative from New York. Born in Schoharie, he attended the common schools, studied law, was admitted to the bar in New York and commenced the practice of law in Schoharie. He was judge of the Court of Common Pleas of Schoharie County in 1795, and was a member of the New York State Assembly in 1798 and 1799.

Swart was elected as a Democratic-Republican to the 10th United States Congress, holding office from March 4, 1807, to March 3, 1809. He was sheriff of Schoharie County in 1810 and 1813, and served in the New York State Senate from 1817 to 1820. He resumed the practice of his profession in Schoharie and died there in 1829; interment was in the Old Stone Fort Cemetery.

References

External links 
 

1752 births
1829 deaths
New York (state) state court judges
Members of the New York State Assembly
New York (state) state senators
People from Schoharie, New York
Democratic-Republican Party members of the United States House of Representatives from New York (state)